Izudin Daði Dervić (born 22 February 1963) is a former footballer. Born in Bosnia, he represented Iceland at international level.

Early life and career
Dervić was born in Bosnia and grew up in Prnjavor where he first started playing football. He later moved to Slovenia where he played for NK Olimpija Ljubljana before moving to Iceland in 1990 to play for Selfoss.

International career
Dervić received an Icelandic citizenship in May 1993 and took up the middle name Daði. Three weeks later he was selected to the Icelandic national team. He debuted for the team against Russia on 2 June 1993, becoming the first naturalized citizen to play for Iceland. He earned a total of 14 caps, scoring no goals. His final international was an August 1995 European Championship qualification match against Switzerland.

References

External links
 
 
 
 Izudin Dervić coaching career at KSÍ 

1963 births
Living people
Sportspeople from Banja Luka
Icelandic people of Bosnia and Herzegovina descent
Association football defenders
Yugoslav footballers
Bosnia and Herzegovina footballers
Icelandic footballers
Iceland international footballers
NK Olimpija Ljubljana (1945–2005) players
Selfoss men's football players
Fimleikafélag Hafnarfjarðar players
Valur (men's football) players
Knattspyrnufélag Reykjavíkur players
Knattspyrnufélag Fjallabyggðar players
Knattspyrnufélagið Þróttur players
Ungmennafélagið Fjölnir players
Yugoslav First League players
Úrvalsdeild karla (football) players
1. deild karla players
3. deild karla players
Icelandic football managers
Icelandic people with family names